The Alfa Romeo Iguana is a concept car produced by Alfa Romeo in 1969. It was designed by Giorgetto Giugiaro at Italdesign.

Background
The car was previewed at the Sport Car Show in Monza and presented officially at the Turin Auto Show in 1969. It was the first Alfa Romeo model designed by Giorgetto Giugiaro as head of his own carrozzeria, and was based on the Alfa Romeo 33 Stradale road-going version of the Tipo 33/2. Although it did not go into production, the Iguana is reflected in Giugiaro's later work. The body of the Iguana was painted a metal-flake grey, while the roof frame and cabin pillars were finished in brushed metal, a treatment Giugiaro later applied to the DMC DeLorean.

Technical details

The chassis inherited from the Stradale was of tubular steel. The fuel tank was lined with rubber. The body was a coupé executed in fibreglass. The low sloping nose between raised sections over the wheels and depth of the windshield would be revisited on the Porsche Tapiro and Maserati Bora, while the definition of the rear elements will also appear in other cars styled by Giugiaro, notably the Alfetta GT.

The Iguana was initially equipped with a  aluminium V8 engine delivering  of power at 8,000 rpm. This had been the first V8 engine produced by the House of the Snake, and in the Iguana was combined with a SPICA fuel injection system and a six-speed Colotti gearbox.

Suspension was upper and lower A-arms at all four corners. Brakes were Girling disks, and the wheels were Campagnolo alloys.

References

Related vehicles
 Alfa Romeo Tipo 33
 Alfa Romeo 33 Stradale
 Alfa Romeo Carabo
 Alfa Romeo 33 33/2 Coupé Speciale
 Alfa Romeo 33 Cuneo
 Alfa Romeo Navajo

External links

 
 

Iguana
Italdesign concept vehicles
Cars introduced in 1969